Rhodoprasina winbrechlini is a species of moth of the family Sphingidae. It is known from northern Vietnam and southern Yunnan in China.

Adult males have long antennae. The forewings are green with a faint blue tint. There is a red area on the hindwing upperside which does not extend beyond the median line. The distal half of the wing is greenish.

Adults are on wing in early March in northern Vietnam and early April in Yunnan.

References

Rhodoprasina
Moths described in 1996